Eduardo Alberto "Lalo" Uribe Oshiro (born 2 September 1985 in Lima) is a Peruvian footballer currently playing for Sport Boys in the Peruvian Primera División. He mainly plays as a central midfielder.

Honours

Club 
Juan Aurich
 Torneo Descentralizado (1): 2011
Melgar
 Torneo Descentralizado (1): 2015

References

External links
 
 
 

1985 births
Living people
Footballers from Lima
Association football midfielders
Peruvian footballers
Club Alianza Lima footballers
Unión Huaral footballers
Coronel Bolognesi footballers
Juan Aurich footballers
Real Garcilaso footballers
Sporting Cristal footballers
Universidad Técnica de Cajamarca footballers
FBC Melgar footballers
Carlos A. Mannucci players
Unión Comercio footballers
Sport Boys footballers
Peruvian Primera División players
Peruvian Segunda División players